Melodi Grand Prix 2006 (shortened MGP 2006) is the television show in which the Norwegian entry for the Eurovision Song Contest 2006 was chosen.

The contest was held on February 4 in the Oslo Spektrum and was hosted by Synnøve Svabø and Stian Barsnes Simonsen. In addition, the Eurovision commentator for Norwegian television, Jostein Pedersen, played a role as side commentator for all five shows. In the three weeks leading up to the final, four qualification rounds were held; three semifinals and a second-chance round, where the last two final tickets were given out.

The winner was Christine Guldbrandsen with the song "Alvedansen".

Swedish dominance

This year, NRK received 586 compositions, one of the highest numbers ever. However, the foreign songs exceed 60% of this total, coming mainly from Swedish composers. And as a result, 13 out of the 18 semi final entries are written by Swedes. However, the top two songs at MGP 2006 were written by Norwegians.

A new concept

The three initial semi finals were held in three different Norwegian cities, based on the successful formula that has been used in the Swedish Melodifestivalen since 2002. That is to say, the semi final concept in Norway is new of the year. NRK has decided that those cities which were awarded with the concept this year, will have the right to host one semi final each for the next three years.

Semi-finals

Semi-final 1

Semi-final 2

Semi-final 3

Siste Sjansen round

Final

A total of 264,693 televotes were counted in the super final.
Both the top two songs in the super final were composed by Norwegians, despite NRK having only selected five songs with Norwegian composers out of the initial 18 semi final entries.

Spokespersons
Northern Norway: Nina Birgitte Einem
Central Norway: Kristin Haug
Southern Norway: Knut Knudsen Eigenland
Eastern Norway: Jonas Brønna
Western Norway: Øyver Bakke

External links
Official site

NRK: Melodi Grand Prix 2006

2006
Eurovision Song Contest 2006
2006 in Norwegian music
2006 song contests
2006 Norwegian television seasons